North Borneo competed at the 1956 Summer Olympics in Melbourne, Australia. It was the only Olympic appearance by the former British protectorate, which formed part of the new country Malaysia in 1963.

Medal tables

Medals by Summer Games

Athletics

Both of the North Bornean athletes competed in the same event—men's triple jump—but neither qualified for the final.

References

External links
 
 
 
 
 

Nations at the 1956 Summer Olympics
1956
British North Borneo
History of Sabah
1956 in Malayan sport